This is a list of IBO world champions, showing every world champion certificated by the International Boxing Organization (IBO) since 1993.

r – Champion relinquished title
s – Champion stripped of title

Heavyweight

Cruiserweight

Light heavyweight

Super middleweight

Middleweight

Super welterweight

Welterweight

Super lightweight

Lightweight

Super featherweight

Featherweight

Super bantamweight

Bantamweight

Super flyweight

Flyweight

Light flyweight

Minimumweight

See also
List of IBO female world champions
List of WBA world champions
List of WBC world champions
List of IBF world champions
List of WBO world champions
List of The Ring world champions

References

External links
Official list of current IBO champions 

IBO

IBO